Southwick Regional School (SRS) is a public high school in Southwick, Massachusetts, United States serving grades 712 of the Southwick-Tolland-Granville Regional School District, which is made up of the towns of Southwick, Tolland, and Granville.

Performance
Southwick Regional School was assessed by the New England Association of Schools and Colleges in 2004.

The school meets all requirements of the federal No Child Left Behind Act.

Extracurriculars

Clubs and organizations
The band and chorus have received national recognition over the years, earning superior ratings and trophies from festivals in New York, Baltimore, Philadelphia, and Orlando.   Southwick Regional School Performing Arts performed Beauty and the Beast in April 2007. In March 2008 the school performed Joseph and the Amazing Technicolor Dreamcoat. In May 2022, the school performed a production of Seussical the Musical.

The school has a number of clubs including the Interact Club, As Schools Match Wits Team, the Diversity Club, the National Honor Society, the Drama Club, the Jazz Band, the Math Team, the Spanish Club, the French Club, the Chess Club, and the Debate Team.

Sports
STGRSD is active in interscholastic sports.

Rebecca Lobo, a former WNBA player, was a graduate of Southwick Regional School and held a state scoring record of 2,710 points, while in high school.

In 2007 and 2008 Southwick won the Western Mass championship and the Division II title in Boys Varsity Track. The boys cross–country team has won several division titles, the most recent in 2008, which was a perfect season with a 15–0 record and the Division II Western Mass title.

Southwick's wrestling program won the Western Mass Championship in 1997, 1998, 2002, 2003, 2004, 2005, 2006, 2007, and 2008.  The team has produced three individual state champions and its peak performance as a team was second at the State Dual Meet Championship in 2007.

In 2011, the Boys Varsity Soccer won the Western Massachusetts championship, while Varsity Golf, Varsity Baseball, and Boys Varsity Track won their league titles.

The Southwick Field Hockey program has produced many Western Mass titles.

Southwick does not have a football team. The School added a Junior Varsity Hockey team prior to the 2016-2017 school year.

Notable alumni
Rebecca Lobo, women's professional WNBA basketball player

References

External links
High School website
District website
greatschools

Schools in Hampden County, Massachusetts
Public high schools in Massachusetts